1-Phosphatidylinositol-4,5-bisphosphate phosphodiesterase gamma-2 is an enzyme that in humans is encoded by the PLCG2 gene.

Function 

From OMIM as of March 24, 2020:

Enzymes of the phospholipase C family catalyze the hydrolysis of phospholipids to yield diacylglycerols and water-soluble phosphorylated derivatives of the lipid head groups. A number of these enzymes have specificity for phosphoinositides. Of the phosphoinositide-specific phospholipase C enzymes, C-beta is regulated by heterotrimeric G protein-coupled receptors, while the closely related C-gamma-1 (PLCG1; MIM 172420) and C-gamma-2 enzymes are controlled by receptor tyrosine kinases. The C-gamma-1 and C-gamma-2 enzymes are composed of phospholipase domains that flank regions of homology to noncatalytic domains of the SRC oncogene product, SH2 and SH3.

Interactions 

PLCG2 has been shown to interact with:
 Bruton's tyrosine kinase, 
 GAB2,
 LYN, 
 PTPN11,  and
 SHC1

References

Further reading 

 
 
 
 
 
 
 
 
 
 
 
 
 
 
 
 
 
 
 

EC 3.1.4